Tesagrotis is a genus of moths of the family Noctuidae.

Species
Tesagrotis atrifrons (Grote, 1873)
Tesagrotis piscipellis (Grote, 1878)
Tesagrotis corrodera (Smith, 1907)
Tesagrotis amia (Dyar, 1903) (syn: Tesagrotis fortiter (Barnes & McDunnough, 1918)

References
Natural History Museum Lepidoptera genus database

Noctuinae